The 2019 Townsville Blackhawks season was the fifth in the club's history. Coached by Aaron Payne and captained by Sam Hoare, they competed in the Intrust Super Cup. Payne, a former North Queensland Cowboys player and Townsville junior, took over as head coach from Kristian Woolf, who joined the Newcastle Knights as an assistant coach.

Season summary

Milestones
 Round 1: Tom Gilbert, Ryan Lloyd and Shaun Nona made their debuts for the club.
 Round 1: Tom Gilbert scored his first try for the club.
 Round 1: Aaron Payne recorded his first win as head coach.
 Round 3: Sam Murphy and Nathan Traill made their debuts for the club.
 Round 4: Tom Opacic made his debut for the club.
 Round 5: Murray Taulagi made his debut for the club.
 Round 5: Joe Boyce scored his first try for the club.
 Round 6: Wiremu Greig and Jayden Stephens made their debuts for the club.
 Round 8: Josh Chudleigh made his debut for the club.
 Round 9: Chippie Korostchuk made his debut for the club.
 Round 9: Josh Chudleigh scored his first try for the club.
 Round 15: Cody Maughan made his debut for the club.
 Round 15: Nathan Traill scored his first try for the club.
 Round 16: Michael Bell made his debut for the club.
 Round 16: Shaun Nona scored his first try for the club.
 Round 17: Michael Bell scored his first try for the club.
 Round 21: Daejarn Asi made his debut for the club.
 Round 21: Daejarn Asi scored his first try for the club.
 Round 22: Nathan Barrett made his debut for the club.
 Finals Week 1: Campbell Duffy made his debut for the club.
 Finals Week 1: Nathan Barrett scored his first try for the club.

2019 squad

Squad movement

Gains

Losses

Fixtures

Pre-season

Regular season

Finals

Statistics

Honours

Club
Player of the Year: Tom Gilbert
Players' Player: Temone Power
Back of the Year: Kyle Laybutt
Forward of the Year: Temone Power
Under 20 Player of the Year: Adam Cook
Under 18 Player of the Year: Hamiso Tabuai-Fidow

References

2019 in Australian rugby league
2019 in rugby league by club
Townsville Blackhawks